The Body Has a Head is an album by King Missile frontman John S. Hall, released exclusively in Germany in 1996. Though billed as a Hall "solo album," the collection features considerable input from multi-instrumentalists Sasha Forte, Bradford Reed, and Jane Scarpantoni, all of whom would become members of the next incarnation of King Missile ("King Missile III") and contribute to that group's "debut" album, 1998's Failure.

King Missile's compilation The Green Album, sold exclusively at live shows, contains all the tracks from The Body Has a Head plus fourteen live King Missile tracks and an alternate version of the song "Gay/Not Gay" from Failure.

Track listing
All lyrics by Hall.

"The Bunny Who Wanted to Be a Rat" (Forte, Hall, Scarpantoni) – 3:08
"Punish Him" (Dougie Bowne, Forte, Hall, Scarpantoni) – 3:06
"A Good Hard Look" (Bowne, Forte, Hall, Scarpantoni) – 2:16
This track appears in a different arrangement on Failure.
"On the Metro North" (Bowne, Forte, Hall, Scarpantoni) – 2:14
This track first appeared on the compilation Fast Forward Sampler #2 under the band name "The Body Has a Head."
"The Friendly Man" (Bowne, Forte, Hall, Scarpantoni) – 2:54
"Keep Walking" (Bowne, Forte, Hall, Scarpantoni) – 3:37
"My Lover" (Forte, Hall, Scarpantoni) – 2:35
"Wizard" (Bowne, Forte, Hall, Scarpantoni) – 2:03
"A Little Restraint" (Forte, Hall, Scarpantoni) – 1:22
"Clamsauce" (Bowne, Forte, Hall, Scarpantoni) – 2:10
"Satan" (Forte, Hall, Scarpantoni) – 3:06
"Freyne" (Bowne, Forte, Hall, Scarpantoni) – 2:26
"The Angel" (Forte, Hall, Scarpantoni) – 1:17
"Nine Wishes" (Forte, Hall, Reed, Scarpantoni) – 1:09
"Prophecy" (Forte, Hall, Reed, Scarpantoni) – 3:47

Personnel
John S. Hall – lead vocals, guitar on "The Angel"
Dougie Bowne – drums on "Punish Him," "On the Metro North," "The Friendly Man," "Keep Walking," "Wizard," "Clamsauce," and "Freyne," tambourine on "Punish Him," guitar on "Punish Him" and "Clamsauce," vibes on "Clamsauce"
Sasha Forte – violin, bass, backing vocals on "Punish Him," guitar on "The Bunny Who Wanted to Be a Rat," "Punish Him," "On the Metro North," "Clamsauce," and "Prophecy," percussion on "A Little Restraint," lasso d'amore on "Satan," synthesizer on "Nine Wishes," bells on "Prophecy"
Bradford Reed – drums on "Nine Wishes" and "Prophecy," pencilina on "Prophecy," bells on "Prophecy"
Jane Scarpantoni – cello, bass on "Punish Him" and "On the Metro North," backing vocals on "Punish Him," piano on "The Friendly Man" and "Keep Walking," Wurlitzer on "The Friendly Man," synthbassoon on "The Friendly Man," vacuum cleaner on "A Little Restraint," guitar on "Satan," flute on "The Angel," bells on "Prophecy"

John S. Hall albums
1996 albums